The 2021–22 Copa del Rey was the 120th staging of the Copa del Rey (including two seasons where two rival editions were played). The winners were assured a place in the 2022–23 UEFA Europa League group stage. Both the winners and the runners-up qualified for the four-team 2022–23 Supercopa de España.

Barcelona were the defending champions, but they were eliminated by previous two seasons' runners-up Athletic Bilbao in the round of 16. Real Betis won the final 5–4 over Valencia on penalties following a 1–1 draw after extra time for their third Copa del Rey title.

As across Spain, match times up to 31 October 2021 and from 27 March 2022 were CEST (UTC+2). Times on interim ("winter") days were CET (UTC+1). Matches played in the Canary Islands used the WET (UTC±00:00).

Schedule and format
In August 2021, the RFEF released the calendar of the competition and confirmed the format of the previous season would remain.

Notes
From this season on, the away goals rule in the semi-finals was abolished.
Games ending in a draw were decided in extra time, and if still level, by a penalty shoot-out.

Qualified teams
The following teams qualified for the competition. Reserve teams were excluded.

Preliminary round

Draw
Teams were divided into four groups according to geographical criteria.

Matches

Notes

First round
The first round was played by 112 of the 116 qualified teams, with the exceptions being the four participants of the 2021–22 Supercopa de España. The ten winners from the previous preliminary round were paired with ten teams from La Liga. The four Copa Federación semi-finalists with another four teams from La Liga and the last two La Liga teams with two teams from Segunda RFEF. Twenty-one teams from Segunda RFEF were paired with the twenty-one Segunda División teams, the last nine teams from Segunda RFEF were paired with nine Primera RFEF teams. Finally, the remaining twenty teams from Primera RFEF were paired between them. In the case of opponents from the same division, the home advantage was decided by whichever team was drawn first; otherwise, the match was held in the stadium of the lower division team. A total of 56 games were played from 30 November to 2 December 2021.

Draw
The draw was held on 18 November 2021. Teams were divided into six pots.

Matches

 

Notes

Second round

Draw
The draw was held on 3 December 2021 in the RFEF headquarters in Las Rozas. Teams were divided into 4 pots according to their division in the 2021–22 season. Matches were played at the stadiums of lower-ranked teams. A total of 28 games were played from 14 to 16 December 2021.

Matches

Notes

Final phase

Bracket

Round of 32

Draw
The draw was held on 17 December 2021 in the RFEF headquarters in Las Rozas. The four participant teams of the 2021–22 Supercopa de España were drawn with the teams from the lowest category. After them, the remaining teams from the lowest categories faced the rest of La Liga teams. Matches were played at stadiums of lower-ranked teams.

Matches

Notes

Round of 16

Draw
The draw was held on 7 January 2022 in the RFEF headquarters in Las Rozas. Teams are divided into 3 pots according to their division in the 2021–22 season. When possible, matches will be played at the stadiums of lower-ranked teams. Otherwise, the first team drawn plays home. A total of 8 games will be played from 15 to 20 January 2022.

Matches

Notes

Quarter-finals

Draw
The draw was held on 21 January 2022 in the RFEF headquarters in Las Rozas. As there are no teams from the lower divisions, home teams were selected by a draw.

Matches

Notes

Semi-finals

Draw
The draw for the semi-finals was held on 4 February 2022 in the RFEF headquarters in Las Rozas.

Summary

|}

Matches

Real Betis won 3–2 on aggregate.

Valencia won 2–1 on aggregate

Final

Top scorers

Notes

References

External links

Royal Spanish Football Federation official website
Copa del Rey at LFP website

2021–22
1